Pininfarina S.p.A. (short for Carrozzeria Pininfarina) is an Italian car design firm and coachbuilder, with headquarters in Cambiano, Turin, Italy. The company was founded by Battista "Pinin" Farina in 1930.

On 14 December 2015, the Indian multinational giant Mahindra Group acquired 76.06% of Pininfarina S.p.A. for about €168 million.

Pininfarina is employed by a wide variety of automobile manufacturers to design vehicles. These firms have included long-established customers such as Ferrari, Alfa Romeo, Peugeot, Fiat, GM, Lancia, and Maserati, to emerging companies in the Asian market with Chinese manufactures like AviChina, Chery, Changfeng, Brilliance, JAC and VinFast in Vietnam and Korean manufacturers Daewoo and Hyundai.

Since the 1980s, Pininfarina has also designed high-speed trains, buses, trams, rolling stocks, automated light rail cars, people movers, yachts, airplanes, and private jets. Since the 1986 creation of "Pininfarina Extra", it has consulted on industrial design, interior design, architecture, and graphic design.

Pininfarina was run by Battista's son Sergio Pininfarina until 2001, then his grandson Andrea Pininfarina until he died in 2008. After Andrea's death, his younger brother Paolo Pininfarina was appointed as CEO.

At its height in 2006, the Pininfarina Group employed 2,768 with subsidiary company offices throughout Europe, as well as in Morocco and the United States. As of 2012, with the end of series automotive production, employment has shrunk to 821. Pininfarina is registered and publicly traded on the Milan Stock Exchange, Borsa Italiana.

History

The days as a specialist coachbuilder 

When automobile designer and builder Battista "Pinin" Farina broke away from his brother's coachbuilding firm, Stabilimenti Farina, in 1928, he founded "Carrozzeria Pinin Farina" with financial help from his wife's family and Vincenzo Lancia. That first year the firm employed eighteen and built 50 automobile bodies.

On 22 May 1930 papers were filed to become a corporation, Società anonima Carrozzeria Pinin Farina headquartered in Turin, Italy, at 107 Corso Trapani.
During the 1930s, the company built bodies for Lancia, Alfa Romeo, Isotta Fraschini, Hispano-Suiza, Fiat, Cadillac, and Rolls-Royce. With its close relationship with Lancia, the pioneer of the monocoque in automobile design, Farina became the first coachbuilder to build bodies for the new technique also known as unibody construction. This development happened in the mid-1930s when others saw the frameless construction as the end of the independent coachbuilder.

In 1939, World War II ended automobile production, but the company had 400 employees building 150 bodies a month. The war effort against the Allies brought work making ambulances and searchlight carriages. The Pinin Farina factory was destroyed by Allied bombers ending the firm's operations.

After World War II 

After the war, Italy was banned from the 1946 Paris Motor Show. The Paris show was attended by 809,000 visitors (twice the pre-war figure), and queues stretched from the main gate all the way to the Seine. Pinin Farina and his son Sergio, determined to defy the ban, drove two of their cars (an Alfa Romeo 6C 2500 S and a Lancia Aprilia cabriolet) from Turin to Paris and found a place at the entrance to the exhibition to display the two new creations. The managers of the Grand Palais said of the display, "the devil Pinin Farina", but to the press and the public, it was the successful "Turin coachbuilder's anti-salon".

At the end of 1945 the Cisitalia 202 Coupé was designed. An elegantly proportioned design with a low hood, it is the car that usually is given credit for establishing Pinin Farina's reputation. The Pinin Farina design was honored in the Museum of Modern Art's landmark presentation "Eight Automobiles" in 1951. A total of 170 Coupés were produced by Pinin Farina.

The publicity of the Museum of Modern Art exhibit brought Pinin Farina to the attention of Nash-Kelvinator managers. The subsequent cooperation with Nash Motors resulted in high-volume production of Pinin Farina designs and provided a major entry into the United States market. In 1952, Farina visited the U.S. for the unveiling of his design for the Nash Ambassador and Statesman lines, which, although they did carry some details of Pinin Farina's design, were largely designed by Nash's then-new in-house styling staff when the original Farina-designed model proved unsuited to American tastes, exhibiting a popular 1950s appearance called "ponton". The Nash-Healey sports car body was, however, completely designed and assembled with Nash drivetrains in limited numbers from 1952 to 1954 at Pinin Farina's Turin facilities. Nash heavily advertised its link to the famous Italian designer, much as Studebaker promoted its longtime association with Raymond Loewy. As a result of Nash's million advertising campaign, Pinin Farina became well known in the U.S.

Pinin Farina also built the bodies for the limited-series Cadillac Eldorado Brougham for General Motors in 1959 and 1960. They were assembled in Italy and shipped back to the U.S. There were 99 Broughams built in 1959 and 101 in 1960. A similar arrangement was repeated in the late 1980s when Pininfarina designed (and partially assembled) the Cadillac Allanté at the San Giusto Canavese factory. The car bodies were assembled and painted in Italy before being flown from the Turin International Airport to Detroit for final vehicle assembly.

The Ferrari partnership 
It started in 1951 with a meeting at a restaurant in Tortona, a small town halfway between Turin and Modena. This neutral territory was chosen because neither Farina nor Enzo Ferrari wanted to meet at the other's headquarters. Battista's son, Sergio Pininfarina recalled, "It is not difficult to imagine how I felt that afternoon when my father, without taking his eyes off the road for one moment, told me his decision as we drove back to Turin: "From now on you'll be looking after Ferrari, from A to Z. Design, engineering, technology, construction—the lot!"—I was over the moon with happiness."

Since that meeting a 61 year realtionship endured where the only road-going production Ferrari not designed by Pininfarina was the 1973 Dino 308 GT4. Their relationship was so close that Pininfarina became a partner of Ferrari in "Scuderia Ferrari SpA SEFAC", the organization that ran Ferrari's race team from 1961 to 1989, Pinin was a vice president of Ferrari, and Sergio later sat on Ferrari's board of directors.

However, this special relationship came to an end with the 2012-17 Ferrari F12berlinetta, the last model fully penned by Pininfarina, while Centro Stile Ferrari has designed each car since 2013's LaFerrari.

The move to large-scale manufacturing

From 1954 to 1955 Pinin Farina purchased land in Grugliasco, outside of Turin, for a new factory. "The factory in no way would look like the one of Corso Trapani. It would be a car no longer on my measurements but those of my children, built looking like them; I had this in mind and wanted it," said Farina.

Around the same time, Alfa Romeo accepted Pininfarina's design over Bertone for the new Giulietta Spider. The Alfa was the first vehicle that Pinin Farina produced in large numbers. Alfa Romeo chose Pinin Farina to produce the Spider largely because they felt confident they could produce 20 cars daily for a run of 1,000 bodies. The Spider was a huge success for Alfa Romeo and Pinin Farina. Max Hoffman, the importer for the United States, said he could sell as many as they could make. In 1958, the first year of production, they produced 1,025 units which then expanded to over 4,000 in 1959, the first full year of the new Grugliasco factory.

The second generation of leadership 
Starting with the planning for the new plant in Grugliasco in 1956, Farina started to groom his replacements–Sergio his son, and Renzo Carli his son-in-law. To his heirs apparent, Farina said of the Corso Trapani facility, "This old plant has reached the limits of its growth. It has no room for expansion and is far from being up to date. If I were alone, I'd leave it as it is. But I want you to decide which way to go–to stay as we are or to enlarge. Either way is fine with me. It's your decision to make and I don't want to know what it is. I'm finished, and it's your time to take over. The future is absolutely up to you." In 1958, upon leaving for a world tour, Farina added, "In my family, we inherit our legacies from live people–not from the dead."

Change of corporate name to Pininfarina
In 1961 at the age of 68, "Pinin" Farina formally turned his firm over to his son Sergio and his son-in-law, Renzo Carli, it was the same year that the President of Italy formally authorized the change of Farina's last name to Pininfarina, and the business took on the same name.

Pininfarina was run by Battista's grandson Andrea Pininfarina from 2001 until he died in 2008. Andrea's younger brother Paolo Pininfarina was appointed successor.

Modernizing for a new world 
Starting in the mid-1960s, Pininfarina started to make investments in the science of automotive design, a strategy to differentiate itself from the other Italian coachbuilders.

In 1966, Pininfarina opened the Studies and Research Centre (Studi e Ricerche) in Grugliasco. The research centre occupied 8,000 sq. metres (2 acres) and employed 180 technicians capable of producing 25 prototypes a year.

The Calculation and Design Centre was set up in 1967, the first step in the process of technological evolution that, during the 1970s, would take Pininfarina into the lead in automated bodywork design.

Then in 1972 construction of a full-sized wind tunnel was completed. The project was started in 1966. When it opened, it was the first wind tunnel with the ability to test full-sized cars in Italy and one of the first in the world with this ability. For example, GM's full-sized wind tunnel did not open until 1980.

New infrastructure and expansion 
The 1980s started a period of expansion for Pininfarina.

In 1982, the company opened "Pininfarina Studi e Ricerche" in Cambiano. It was separate from the factory and wind tunnel in Grugliasco to keep design and research activities independent from manufacturing. On 14 October 2002, Pininfarina inaugurated a new engineering center. The new facility, built at the Cambiano campus, gave greater visibility and independence to the engineering operations.

In 1983, Pininfarina reached an agreement with General Motors to design and build the Cadillac Allanté. The Allanté project led to the building of the San Giorgio factory in 1985.

In 1996, Mitsubishi entered into talks for Pininfarina to build their new compact SUV, the Pajero, in Italy. While Mitsubishi recognized Pininfarina's expertise in design and engineering, the reason for choosing them was that manufacturing costs were half of those in Germany. After entering into an agreement in 1996, Pininfarina purchased an industrial site at Bairo Canavese near Turin, Italy. in April 1997, Bairo Canavese was dedicated to the production of the new Mitsubishi Pajero Pinin.

Pininfarina Sverige AB in Uddevalla, Sweden, was established in 2003 as a joint venture (JV) between Volvo Cars and Pininfarina to produce a new Volvo convertible that will be sold in Europe and the United States. The JV is owned 60% by Pininfarina and 40% by Volvo. The C70 model designed by Volvo's John Kinsey—was launched on 13 April 2006, sharing the Volvo P1 platform used in the S40.

New economic realities 
In April 2008, after three years of serious losses totaling 115 million euros at the end of 2007, Pininfarina made the first of several moves to raise capital and restructure its enormous debt:

29 April 2008 
Pininfarina announced Piero Ferrari, Alberto Bombassei (chairman of Brembo), and the Marsiaj family (founders of the Sabelt seatbelt company), will join with Vincent Bolloré, a French financier, and Ratan Tata, head of India's Tata Group conglomerate, who already announced their plans to invest. The five would together invest a million. Funding would come through the sale of stock to other investors. The Pininfarina family was willing to reduce its share from 55% to 30%, which would still be enough to secure a controlling interest.

31 December 2008 
On 31 December 2008, Pininfarina announced a debt restructuring that would require the family to sell its stake in the company. The agreement was made after Pininfarina's value dropped 67% during 2008, with a market capitalization of about €36 million. It had total debt of €598 million at the end of November. Of that amount, €555 million was the subject of the debt restructuring agreement that was agreed on with a consortium of banks.

24 March 2009 
Pincar, Pininfarina's family holding company, announced it has hired investment bank Leonardo & Co. to find a buyer for its 50.6% stake in Pininfarina per the debt restructuring agreement reached in December.

4 January 2011 
Pininfarina released a statement saying that it is still gathering "possible offers from potential buyers," adding it would release more information when it was appropriate.

Company sources added that the family will not sell its entire 50.7% stake but that Pincar would no longer be a majority shareholder.

14 February 2012
An agreement with creditor banks including Intesa Sanpaolo, UniCredit, Mediobanca, and Banca Monte dei Paschi di Siena to restructure the net debt of 76 million euros is on track and will be reached in the coming months, said three sources close to the situation. "The debt situation is stable, and the talks are not contentious, so there is no hurry," said one of the sources, speaking anonymously. "The agreement will fix the capital structure for the foreseeable future."

When finalized, the debt accord will give control of the family's 77% stake to its creditor banks, ending the Pininfarina family's ownership.

The deal will close a chapter that began in 2008 when the banks swapped 180 million euros in debt in exchange for a promise of proceeds from a future sale of part of the Pininfarina's family stake.

However, no takers materialized. Potential buyers were not willing to acquire a design company when they can easily contract its services, said one of the people familiar with the situation.

15 February 2012 
In a statement released on 15 February, the Cambiano-based company, which owes over a million to a number of Italian banks, said its debt repayment date had been extended to 2018, from 2015.

The agreement, which will be signed in the next few weeks, will also see the company take advantage of interest rates "significantly lower than [current] market rates". With the new debt restructuring deal with its creditors, Pininfarina will remain under the control of the Pininfarina family.

16 May 2012 
Automotive News reported Pininfarina projects will be profitable in 2012, thanks in part to debt restructuring. The Italian design studio has not been profitable for eight years but signed a deal in April to restructure million in debt. The move effectively stretched the studio's repayment deadline from 2015 to 2018. At the same time, Pininfarina announced it would likely see an operating loss this year, but a one-time gain of millions will result in a net profit. The company lost a million in the first quarter of the preceding year, though that figure dropped to just under a million during Q1 2012.

Pininfarina also saw its net revenue increase by a million.

26 March 2013 
Pininfarina in the black for the first time since 2004 Italian design house Pininfarina predicted last May that it would face an operating loss for 2012 but still come out with a net profit. Both predictions came true: the company is reporting an operating loss of 8.2 million euros and a net profit of 32.9 million euros.

According to Reuters, the good news came because of a debt restructuring arranged the preceding year that gave the company three more years to repay its debt and a one-time gain of approximately 45 million euros. It is the company's first profit since 2004.

Acquisition by Mahindra group (2015–present) 
Mahindra Group, owner of Indian automobile company Mahindra & Mahindra agreed to buy Italian car designer Pininfarina SpA in a deal worth about 168 million euros.

Mahindra group, together with affiliate Tech Mahindra, has a 76% stake in the holding company Pincar for 25.3 million euros. The Indian company will offer the same price for the remaining stock. In addition to buying stock, Mahindra will invest 20 million euros in Pininfarina and provide a guarantee to creditors of 114.5 million euros.

Corporate Governance (2016) 
 President: Paolo Pininfarina
 CEO – General Manager: Silvio Pietro Angori
 Board of Directors: Gianfranco Albertini, Edoardo Garrone, Romina Guglielmetti, Licia Mattioli, Enrico Paraffini, Carlo Pavesio, Roberto Testore.
 Statutory Auditors: Nicola Treves (president), Margherita Spaini, Giovanni Rayneri.

The end of car production operations 
On 10 December 2011, Pininfarina announced it would end all automotive production. In truth, production ended in November 2010 with the conclusion of the contract to produce the Alfa Romeo Brera and Spider at the San Giorgio plant.

Grugliasco factory 
Opened in 1958 with nearly 1,000 employees, by 1960 output exceeded 11,000 car bodies. In 2009 Pininfarina sold the factory to Finpiemonte, the public finance of the Piedmont Region, at the price of 14.4 million euro. Finpiemonte, as part of the deal, leases the plant to Gian Mario Rossignolo at a rent per year for six years renewable.

The Grugliasco sale did not include an adjacent structure that houses the wind tunnel.

San Giorgio plant 

Opened in 1986 to build Cadillac Allante bodies for General Motors, the same year Pininfarina was first listed on the Stock Exchange in Milan. Automotive production ended at San Giorgio with the conclusion of the Ford production in July 2010 and the Alfa Romeo production in November 2010.

Following the end of contract manufacturing activities, San Giorgio Canavese is being used to produce spare parts for cars manufactured in the past.

Bairo Canavese 
Pininfarina opened its third manufacturing plant in 1997. Currently, Pininfarina leases the plant and 57 employees to the Cecomp Group. This agreement to produce 4,000 electric Bolloré Bluecars runs from 1 April 2011 to 31 December 2013. On 13 September 2013 a new lease agreement was announced, this new agreement will run from 1 January 2014 until the end of 2016.

Uddevalla, Sweden Pininfarina Sverige AB 
A joint venture between Pininfarina S.p.A. and Volvo Car Corporation began in 2003. Volvo and Pininfarina S.p.A. have agreed to terminate the joint venture agreement regarding Pininfarina Sverige AB and its operations in Uddevalla, Sweden. As of 31 December 2011, the termination of this agreement would result in a 30 million euros fee paid to Pininfarina.

On 25 June 2013, the last Volvo C70 was produced and the Uddevalla assembly plant was closed.

Notable designers 
Although Pininfarina rarely gave credit to individuals, many of the designers of the past have become known. That policy seems to have changed in recent years. As of 2021, Pininfarina had more than 700 employees.

 Franco Scaglione 1951, designer for two months before he left for what is now known as Gruppo Bertone
 Franco Martinengo 1952–72, Director of the Centro Stile
 Adriano Rabbone 1950s, Ferrari Inter, Lancia B24, Nash-Healey Pininfarina
 Francesco Salomone 1940s-1960s Chief Designer and Head of Studio. Lancia B24, Ferrari 275 GTB
 Aldo Brovarone 1954–74, Designer; 1974–88, Managing Director Studi e Ricerche
 Tom Tjaarda 1961–65, Designer
 Filippo Sapino 1967–69; Abarth 2000, Ferrari 512S concept, Ferrari 365 GTC/4. 
 Paolo Martin 1968–72, Chief of the Styling Department; Ferrari Modulo
 Diego Ottina 1970—; Ferrari Pinin, Ferrari Testarossa, Alfa Romeo Vivace Coupé and Spider.
 Lorenzo Ramaciotti 1973–2005 deputy director of Pininfarina Studi e Ricerche, Director General and Chief Designer, CEO of Pininfarina SpA Research and Development
 Guido Campoli 1970s–1980s; Ferrari Testarossa
 Ian Cameron 1975–1981; Ferrari Testarossa (1985) 
 Pierangelo Andreani 1972–76; Ferrari Mondial
 Enrico Fumia 1976–91; 1982: Manager at Pininfarina R&D – Models and Prototypes Development; 1988: Manager at Pininfarina R&D – Design and Development; 1989: Deputy General Manager at Pininfarina R&D
 Emanuele Nicosia 1977–85; Ferrari Testarossa
 Elvio d'Aprile 1982–1995; Ferrari 550 Maranello 
 Pietro Camardella 1984–93; Ferrari F40, 512 TR, F50, Mythos, 456 GT
 Marco Tencone 1988–1992
 Leonardo Fioravanti 1988–91, managing director and CEO of Pininfarina Studi e Ricerche.
 Maurizio Corbi 1989—present Senior Designer. Ferrari F50, F355, 550 Maranello 
 Davide Arcangeli 1990s; Peugeot 406 Coupé, Honda Argento Vivo.
 Goran Popović 1993–2011; Ferrari 360 Modena
 Jeremy Malick 2000–2002, Designer; 2009–2016, Senior Designer 	
 Dimitri Vicedomini 2001–2012, Senior Car Designer 
 Jason Castriota 2001–2008; Ferrari P4/5 by Pininfarina, Ferrari 599, Maserati GranTurismo.
 Ken Okuyama 2004–2006, Creative Director
 Luca Borgogno 2005—2015, Lead Designer, Ferrari Sergio, Sp03, New Stratos, Pininfarina Battista.
 Nazzareno Epifani 2006—present, Head of Exterior Design. Pininfarina Sintesi, Alfa Romeo 2uettottanta, Ferrari 458 Spider, Pininfarina Cambiano, Ferrari SP12 EC, Hybrid Kinetik H600, Automobili Pininfarina Battista, Karma GT by Pininfarina
 Lowie Vermeersch 2007–10, design director.
 Brano Mauks 2007–2014, Senior Designer. Ferrari Sergio. 
 Carlo Palazzani 2005–2014, Lead Designer; Ferrari 458 	
 Felix Kilbertus 2011–2014, Lead Designer 	
 Fabio Filippini 2011–2016, Vice President Design and Chief Creative Officer
 Rustom Mazda 2011–present, 2021–present Head of Exterior Design. 
 Carlo Bonzanigo 2017—present, Senior Vice President Design, 1995–2004 Design Project Manager. Maserati GranTurismo, Citroën Osée Concept, Ford Start Concept

Vehicles 
Pininfarina designs, manufactures, assembles, and tests prototypes and production vehicles under contract for other automakers.

Past production 
As of 10 December 2011, Pininfarina announced it would end all mass automotive production with the sale of its 40% stake in the Uddevalla, Sweden plant to Volvo in 2013. In the past, Pininfarina produced cars and car bodies under contract from other automakers. This production includes Pininfarina-designed cars and vehicles designed by others.

A sortable list of complete cars or car bodies manufactured in one of the five Pininfarina factories:

Notable car designs

Pre World War II 
Before the war Pininfarina built car bodies mostly for individual customers, many of the bodies were "one offs" and not mass-produced.

 1931 Lancia Dilambda – the first official Pinin Farina special, presented at the Concours d’Elegance at Villa d’Este
 1931 Hispano-Suiza Coupé
 1931 Cadillac V16 Roadster – for the Maharajah of Orchha
 1932  Fiat 518 Ardita
 1933 Alfa Romeo 8C 2300
 1934 Alfa Romeo 6C 2300 B Cabriolet
 1936 Lancia Astura Cabriolet tipo Bocca – a series of six cars made for the Bocca brothers, Lancia dealers in Biella, Italy.
 1935 Alfa Romeo 6C Pescara Coupé aerodinamico
 1936 Lancia Aprilia
 1936 Alfa Romeo 8C 2900
 1937 Alfa Romeo 6C 2300-B Pescara Berlinetta
 1937 Lancia Aprilia Aerodinamica
 1938 Lancia Astura
 1943 Alfa Romeo 6C 2500 Super Sport Pinin Farina Cabriolet

Concept cars, prototypes and individual commissions 
In addition to production vehicles, Pininfarina creates prototype, show, and custom cars for auto manufacturers, as well as private clients. Most prototypes—such as the Ferrari Mythos, were concept cars, although several have become production models, including the Ferrari 612 Scaglietti and Ferrari F50.

A recent privately commissioned custom example was the Ferrari P4/5 of 2006, a one-car change to the exterior design of the Enzo Ferrari according to the client's specifications. Its design began in September 2005 with sketches by Jason Castriota moving through computer-aided sculpture and stringent wind tunnel testing. More than 200 components were designed especially for the car, including the engine, drivetrain, and other components modified from the original Enzo Ferrari. The Vehicle Identification Number (VIN) is unchanged from the Enzo it was derived from. The P4/5 was publicly revealed on 18 August 2006 at the Pebble Beach Concours d'Elegance and shown again at the Paris Motor Show in late September. Another recent prototype is the Pininfarina Nido, a two-seater sub-compact that could make airbags obsolete.

On 15 May 2013 Pininfarina announced the BMW Pininfarina Gran Lusso Coupé to be revealed on 24 May at the Concorso d’Eleganza Villa d’Este. Pininfarina announced this one-off concept car as the first collaboration between BMW and Pininfarina, but in 1949 BMW commissioned Pininfarina design and build a pbuiltype of the BMW 501—it was rejected for being too modern.

 1947 Alfa Romeo 6C 2500 S Paris Motor Show Prototype
 1947 Lancia Aprilia Paris Motor Show Prototype
 1947 Delahaye 135MS Coupé
 1949 Alfa Romeo 6C 2500 Coupe Speciale 
 1949 BMW 501
 1952 Lancia Aurelia B52 PF 200 spider –version 1
 1952 Lancia Aurelia B52 PF 200 coupé –version 1
 1953 Lancia Aurelia B52 PF 200 spider –version 2 and 3
 1953 Four Berlinetta and one Spyder version of the Maserati A6GCS/53
 1954 Cadillac Series 62 PF -built for Norman Granz
 1954 Jaguar XK120 SE Max Hoffman coupé
 1954 Lancia Aurelia B52 PF 200 coupé –version 2
 1955 Ferrari 375 America Coupé Speciale 
 1955 Lancia Aurelia B55 PF 200 coupé –version 3
 1955 Lancia Florida I coupe
 1955 Lancia Florida I Berlina
 1955 Nash Special 
 1956 Alfa Romeo 6C 3000 CM Super Flow Coupe
 1956 Alfa Romeo 6C 3000 CM Super Flow II Coupe
 1956 Rambler Palm Beach 
 1956 Ferrari 410 Superfast
 1956 Ferrari 4.9 Superfast
 1957 Abarth 750 Bialbero Record
 1957 Abarth 500 Coupe
 1957 Lancia Florida II
 1959 Alfa Romeo 6C 3000 CM Spyder Super Sport
 1959 Ferrari 400 Superamerica Coupé Speciale
 1960 Ferrari 400 Superamerica Superfast II–IV
 1960 Alfa Romeo 6C 3000 CM Super Flow IV Coupe
 1960 Pininfarina X
 1961 Cadillac "Jacqueline" Brougham Coupé (named after Jacqueline Kennedy)
 1961 Ferrari 250 GT Pininfarina Coupe Speciale 
 1962 Fiat 2300 Coupe Speciale
 1963 Alfa Romeo 2600 Coupe Speciale
 1963 Chevrolet Corvair Super Spyder Coupé (2 built)
 1963 Chevrolet Corvette Rondine Coupé
 1963 Fiat 2300 Cabriolet Speciale 
 1963 Fiat 2300 S Coupe Speciale Lausanne 
 1964 Fiat 2300 S Coupe Speciale
 1963 Pininfarina PF Sigma 
 1963 Mercedes-Benz 230SL concept car ("Pininfarina Coupé")
 1964 Abarth 1000 Spyder
 1965 Abarth 1000 Coupe Speciale
 1965 Alfa Romeo Giulia 1600 Sport
 1965 Dino Berlinetta Speciale 
 1965 Ferrari 250 LM Pininfarina Stradale Speciale 
 1965 Fiat 2300 S Coupe Speciale 
 1966 Ferrari 365 P Berlinetta Speciale Tre-posti (2 built) 
 1966 Dino Berlinetta GT
 1967 BMC 1800 Berlina-Aerodinamica
 1967 Dino Berlinetta Competizione 
 1967 Fiat Dino Parigi 
 1968 Bentley T1 Coupe Speciale
 1968 Pininfarina BLMC 1100 
 1968 Alfa Romeo P33 Roadster
 1968 Ferrari P6 Berlinetta Speciale 
 1968 MG EX.234 Roadster 
 1968 Ferrari 250 P5 Berlinetta Speciale 
 1969 Abarth 2000
 1969 Alfa Romeo 33/2 Coupé Speciale
 1969 Ferrari Sigma Grand Prix monoposto F1 
 1969 Ferrari 512S Berlinetta Speciale 
 1969 Fiat 128 Teenager
 1970 Ferrari Modulo 
 1970 Mercedes-Benz 300 SEL 6.3 Pininfarina coupé
 1971 Alfa Romeo P33 Cuneo
 1971 Peugeot Break Riviera 
 1971 NSU Ro 80
 1972 Alfa Romeo Alfetta Spider
 1973 Autobianchi A112 Giovani
 1973 Chevrolet Corvette XP-897GT – Designed by GM, built by Pininfarina 
 1974 Ferrari CR 25
 1974 Fiat 130 Maremma 
 1975 Alfa Romeo Eagle 
 1975 Fiat 130 Opera sedan 
 1975 Peugeot Peugette 
 1978 Fiat Ecos 
 1978 Jaguar XJ Spider
 1978 Lancia Gamma Spider
 1978 Pininfarina CNR-PF 
 1980 Ferrari Pinin
 1980 Lancia Gamma Scala sedan 
 1981 Audi Quartz 
 1982 Lancia Gamma Olgiata 
 1983 Pininfarina Brio – based on Fiat Ritmo Abarth 125 TC 
 1984 Honda HP-X concept car
 1985 Peugeot Griffe 4 
 1986 Alfa Romeo Vivace Coupe and Spider
 1988 Lancia HIT 
 1988 Ferrari F90
 1989 Ferrari Mythos
 1990 Pininfarina CNR E2 
 1991 Opel Chronos 
 1992 Jaguar XJ220 Pininfarina
 1992 Fiat Cinquecento 4x4 pick-up 
 1992 Pininfarina Ethos 
 1993 Pininfarina Ethos 2
 1994 Fiat Spunto
 1994 Pininfarina Ethos 3 
 1995 Honda Argento Vivo 
 1995 Honda SSM 
 1996 Fiat Sing e Song – a pair of concept cars based on the Fiat Bravo and Brava 
 1996 Pininfarina etabeta 
 1996 Ferrari FX
 1997 Peugeot Nautilus 
 1998 Alfa Romeo Dardo Spider
 1999 Fiat Wish Cabriolet / Coupé 
 1999 Pininfarina Metrocubo 
 2000 Ferrari Rossa
 2001 Ford Start
 2001 Citroën Osée
 2002 Hafei HF Fantasy 
 2003 Pininfarina Lotus Enjoy 
 2004 Pininfarina Double-Face 
 2004 Pininfarina Nido 
 2004 Saturn Curve – Built by Pininfarina, designed by GM in Sweden
 2005 Chery M14 
 2005 Maserati Birdcage 75th
 2006 Ferrari 612 Kappa one-off for Peter S. Kalikow 
 2006 Ferrari P4/5 by Pininfarina one-off for James Glickenhaus
 2008 Pininfarina B0 electric car
 2008 Pininfarina Sintesi
 2008 Rolls-Royce Phantom Drophead Coupé Hyperion
 2009 Tata Pr1ma 
 2009 Ferrari P540 Superfast Aperta – one-off for Edward Walson, based on the Ferrari 599 
 2010 Alfa Romeo 2uettottanta concept car
 2010 New Stratos for Michael Stoschek
 2010 Pininfarina Nido EV 
 2012 Pininfarina Cambiano 
 2012 Ferrari SP12 EC one-off for Eric Clapton (with Ferrari Styling Centre)
 2013 Pininfarina Sergio 
 2013 BMW Gran Lusso Coupé
 2014 Ferrari SP FFX
 2014 Ferrari SP America
 2015 Ferrari Sergio
 2016 H2 Speed concept car
 2016 Ferrari SP275 RW Competizione one-off (with Ferrari Styling Centre)
 2017 Fittipaldi EF7 Vision Gran Turismo by Pininfarina.
 2018 Pininfarina HK GT
 2019 Karma GT
 2021 Mahindra Pininfarina Teorema 
 2022 NAMX HUV
 2022 Pininfarina Viritech Apricale

Production cars designed by Pininfarina 
A list of Post WWII cars designed by Pininfarina that went into production.

 1948 Cisitalia 202
 1949 Simca 8 Sport Coupé and Cabriolet 
 1951 Rolls-Royce Silver Dawn continental coupe
 1952 Ferrari 212 Inter
 1952 Nash Ambassador
 1952 Nash-Healey
 1953 Ferrari 250 Europa
 1954 Ferrari 250 Europa GT
 1956 Alfa Romeo Giulietta Spider
 1955 Ferrari 410 Superamerica
 1955 Peugeot 403
 1956 Austin A40 Farina
 1956 Ferrari 250 GT Berlinetta
 1956 Ferrari 250 GT Coupé – Bodied by Boano/Ellena
 1957 Lancia Flaminia
 1957 Ferrari 250 GT Cabriolet
 1957 Ferrari 250 GT California Spyder
 1958 BMC Farina cars – Austin A55 Cambridge Mk II, MG Magnette Mk III, Morris Oxford V, Riley 4/68, Wolseley 15/60
 1958 Ferrari 250 GT Coupé
 1959 Fiat 1800/2100
 1959 Fiat Pininfarina Cabriolet
 1959 Ferrari 400 Superamerica
 1960 Ferrari 250 GT 2+2
 1960 Peugeot 404
 1961 Fiat 2300
 1961 Lancia Flavia Coupé
 1962 BMC ADO16
 1962 Ferrari 250 GT Berlinetta Lusso
 1963 Datsun Bluebird 410
 1963 Ferrari 330 America
 1964 BMC ADO17
 1964 Ferrari 500 Superfast
 1964 Ferrari 275 GTB and GTS
 1965 MGB GT
 1965 Nissan Cedric 130
 1965 Peugeot 204
 1966 Ferrari 330 GT 2+2
 1966 Alfa Romeo Spider
 1966 Ferrari 330 GTC and GTS
 1966 Fiat 124 Sport Spider
 1966 Fiat Dino Spider
 1966 IKA-Renault Torino
 1966 Ferrari 365 California
 1967 Ferrari 365 GT 2+2
 1968 Dino 206 GT
 1968 Ferrari 365 GTC and GTS
 1968 Ferrari 365 GTB/4 and GTS/4
 1968 Peugeot 504 sedan, coupé and cabriolet
 1969 Peugeot 304 Cabriolet and Coupé
 1969 Dino 246 GT and GTS
 1971 Fiat 130 Coupé
 1971 Ferrari 365 GTC/4
 1972 Ferrari 365 GT4 2+2
 1973 Ferrari 365 GT4 BB
 1975 Ferrari 308 GTB and GTS
 1975 Peugeot 604
 1975 Lancia Beta Montecarlo
 1975 Rolls-Royce Camargue
 1976 Ferrari 400
 1976 Lancia Gamma
 1978 Jaguar XJ – series 3 redesign
 1979 Peugeot 505
 1980 Ferrari Mondial
 1981 Lancia Rally 037 Stradale
 1984 Ferrari Testarossa
 1984 Ferrari 288 GTO
 1985 Ferrari 328
 1985 Peugeot 205 Cabriolet and Saloon (4 doors) based on Peugeot's Director of Exterior Design, Gerard Welter's, initial design of the 205 (1983)
 1985 Ferrari 412
 1987 Alfa Romeo 164
 1987 Cadillac Allanté
 1987 Ferrari F40
 1987 Peugeot 405
 1989 Ferrari 348
 1989 Peugeot 605
 1991 Honda Beat 
 1992 Ferrari 456
 1993 Fiat Coupé – Interior only
 1993 Peugeot 306 hatchback and cabriolet
 1993/4 Alfa Romeo GTV & Spider
 1994 Ferrari F355
 1995 MG F – Roof structure only
 1995 Ferrari F50
 1996 Ferrari 550 Maranello
 1996 Lancia Kappa SW
 1997 Peugeot 406 Coupé
 1998 Mitsubishi Pajero Pinin
 1999 Ferrari 360
 1999 Songhuajiang Hafei Zhongyi
 2000 Daewoo Tacuma
 2000 Ferrari 550 Barchetta Pininfarina
 2001 Hyundai Matrix
 2002 Daewoo Lacetti saloon and station wagon
 2002 Enzo Ferrari
 2002 Ferrari 575M Maranello
 2002 Hafei Lobo
 2003 Maserati Quattroporte
 2003 Ford StreetKa
 2004 Ferrari 612 Scaglietti
 2004 Ferrari F430 (with Ferrari-Maserati Concept Design and Development)
 2005 Hafei Saibao/ 2012 Coda (electric car)
 2005 Peugeot 1007
 2005 Ferrari Superamerica
 2006 Ferrari 599 GTB Fiorano
 2006 Mitsubishi Colt CZC
 2006 Volvo C70 – Roof Structure engineering only
 2006 Alfa Romeo Spider
 2006 Brilliance BS4
 2007 Brilliance BC3
 2007 Chery A3 and Chery A3 Sport 
 2007 Ford Focus Coupé-Cabriolet
 2007 Maserati GranTurismo
 2008 Ferrari California
 2008 JAC Heyue Tongyue (J3/A108)
 2009 Ferrari 458 Italia (with Ferrari-Maserati Concept Design and Development)
 2009 Leopaard CS7
 2010 Maserati GranCabrio
 2011 Bolloré Bluecar
 2011 Ferrari FF (with Ferrari Styling Centre)
 2012 Ferrari F12berlinetta (with Ferrari Styling Centre)
 2014 Soueast DX7
 2014 Ferrari California T (with Ferrari Styling Centre)
 2016 Soueast DX3
 2017 Mitsubishi Lancer
 2018 VinFast LUX SA2.0
 2018 VinFast LUX A2.0
 2019 Soueast DX5
 2020 Chery eQ5
 2020 Haima 7X
 2020 Cowin Showjet
 2021 VinFast VF 8
 2021 VinFast VF 9

Electric propulsion 

Pininfarina has an area dedicated to the new electric car Pininfarina Bolloré. Batteries are produced by the French Bolloré Group.

Pininfarina, has introduced its own electric vehicle concept, the Pininfarina B0 (pronounced "B Zero"). Developed in partnership with the Bolloré Group, the vehicle was slated for limited production in 2009 as the Bolloré Bluecar.

Pininfarina displayed a turbine-powered plug-in hybrid called the Cambiano at the 2012 Geneva Motor Show.

At the 2016 Geneva Motor Show Pininfarina revealed the H2 Speed, an electric sports car concept. The H2 Speed is a hydrogen vehicle with two race-specification electric motors which are fed by a hydrogen fuel cell. The hydrogen power unit was designed by Swiss company GreenGT.

Automobili Pininfarina Battista 

On 27 November 2018, it was announced that Automobili Pininfarina had invested over €20m in Pininfarina design services to support plans for its range of luxury electric cars. This includes design and engineering services for the first Pininfarina-branded performance car which is a luxury electric sports car called the Battista (named after company founder Battista 'Pinin' Farina and originally codenamed PF0). Automobili Pininfarina plans to reveal the car at the 2019 Geneva Motor Show. Further details on the Battista surfaced on 4 March 2019. It has 1900 horsepower, and only 150 will be built. It is also related to the Rimac C Two.

Other vehicles

Nautical design
 Primatist Aerotop Pininfarina range: G46, G53, B62, G70.
 Magnum Marine 80' Series
 Pershing 88' Pininfarina Limited Edition, a one-off body designed by Pininfarina. Yacht was used in a Visa Black Card commercial.
 Fincantieri Ottantacinque by Pininfarina Project.
 Schaefer 620 and 800 by Pininfarina, interiors.
 Persico Marine WallyCento Project.
 Azimut 65 Pininfarina.

Mass transport

 1987–2000 ETR 500 Italian high-speed trainset
 1991 SBB-CFF-FFS Re 460 (electric locomotive for the Swiss Federal Railways)
 1996 ALe 426/506 TAF "High Occupancy Train" for Italian commuter lines.
 1997 IC 2000 (double-decker train for the Swiss Federal Railways, matching the electric locomotive Re 460)
 1999–2007 AnsaldoBreda Type 8 Green Line Trolley Car for the MBTA.
 2000 Hispano Carrocera Habit buses.
 2000 SBB-CFF-FFS RABDe 500 (tilting train for the Swiss Federal Railways)
 2001 AnsaldoBreda Class 72 electric multiple unit trains for the Norwegian Railways.
 2001 Cobra tram for Zürich.
 2004 AnsaldoBreda Sirio tram, Athens version
 2005 AnsaldoBreda IC4 inter-city diesel multiple unit trains for the Danish railways.
 2008 AnsaldoBreda Fyra V250 high-speed train for NS Hispeed
 2009 AnsaldoBreda-Firema Metrostar, suburban train for Circumvesuviana in Naples
 2009 Eurostar appoints Pininfarina to undertake design work for train refurbishment.

Other works 

Pininfarina also works with other companies such as SimpleTech for product design.

Other Pininfarina product designs include the 2006 Winter Olympics torch, cauldron and medals, as well as major appliance collections for Gorenje.

In December 1999, Pininfarina cooperated with Casio and designed a watch under its label, the G-Shock GE-2000. However, the watch received criticism from the fans due to its weak strap, which was vulnerable to breaks during normal use.

Pininfarina was a design contractor for the development of the Coca-Cola Freestyle drinks dispenser.

Pininfarina was asked to design a new spray gun for Anest Iwata, creating the Supernova Pininfarina.

Subsidiaries 
Pininfarina Extra, founded in 1986, is the Pininfarina Group design company which does not work in the transport sector. Examples include:

 The Keating Hotel in San Diego, California
 1100 Millecento Residences interiors in  Miami, Florida announced in 2012 
 Beachwalk waterfront residences interiors in  Hallandale Beach, Florida announced in 2013 
 Pininfarina Wine

See also 
 Mahindra & Mahindra
 Magna Steyr
 Heuliez
 Valmet Automotive
 Ken Okuyama
 Sergio Pininfarina
 Battista Farina
 Andrea Pininfarina
 Fabio Filippini
 Gruppo Bertone

References

External links 
 
 Pininfarina Sverige
 
 BMC 1800 & 1100 – detail on these influential design proposals
 The Cisitalia 2002 at the Museum of Modern Art in New York City.
 Cisitalia Museum
 The Keating Hotel in downtown San Diego.
 Pininfarina Wine
 Coachbuild.com encyclopedia: Pininfarina
 Paulo Pininfarina Exclusive Interview in West Coast Midnight Run art book Fashion Edition

 
1930 establishments in Italy
2015 mergers and acquisitions
Battery electric vehicle manufacturers
Coachbuilders of Italy
Companies listed on the Borsa Italiana
Contract vehicle manufacturers
Convertible top suppliers
Design companies established in 1930
Design companies of Italy
Electric vehicle manufacturers of Italy
Engineering companies of Italy
Italian brands
Mahindra Group
Manufacturing companies based in Turin
Metropolitan City of Turin
Turin motor companies
Vehicle manufacturing companies established in 1930
Companies based in Turin